Chenareh-ye Sofla (also Romanized as Chenāreh-ye Soflá) is a village in Yusefvand Rural District, in the Central District of Selseleh County, Lorestan Province, Iran. At the time of the 2006 census, its population was 60, in 15 families.

References 

Towns and villages in Selseleh County